Cézac is the name of the following communes in France:

 Cézac, Gironde, in the Gironde department
 Cézac, Lot, in the Lot department